"Mayonaka no Shadow Boy" is a single released by Hey! Say! JUMP. It was released on October 22, 2008.

Information
The single is Hey! Say! JUMP's first actual love song, which is used as a theme to the TV drama Scrap Teacher starring Hey! Say! JUMP members Daiki Arioka, Ryosuke Yamada, Yuto Nakajima, Yuri Chinen. The song has sad, passionate lyrics and a melancholic melody with a Spanish taste. Limited edition includes a bonus DVD with the music video of "Mayonaka no Shadow Boy," making-of footage, and alternate jacket artwork. Regular edition features three bonus karaoke versions.

By the end of the year, "Mayonaka no Shadow Boy" was reported by Oricon to sell 266,193 copies and was later certified Platinum  by RIAJ denoting over 250,000 shipments.

Regular Edition
CD
 "Mayonaka no Shadow Boy"
 "School Kakumei"
 "Deep Night Kimi Omou"
 "Mayonaka no Shadow Boy" (Original Karaoke)
 "School Kakumei" (Original Karaoke)
 "Deep Night Kimi Omou" (Original Karaoke)

Limited Edition
CD
 "Mayonaka no Shadow Boy" 
 "School Kakumei"

DVD
 "Mayonaka no Shadow Boy" (PV & Making of)

Charts and certifications

Charts

Sales and certifications

References

2008 songs
2008 singles
Oricon Weekly number-one singles
Hey! Say! JUMP songs
Japanese television drama theme songs
J Storm singles